Quyuan may refer to:

Quyuan Management District, formerly the State-run Farm of Quyuan, is a district in Miluo City, Hunan province, China.
Quyuan Town, a town in Zigui County, Hubei, China
Qu Yuan (c. 340–278 BC), poet and official during the Warring States period
Yu Yue (1821–1907), also known as Mr. Quyuan, Qing dynasty scholar, philologist and official